Team Metalced is a Belgian cycling team founded in 2009, which competed at UCI Continental team level, primarily with sponsorship from Cibel between 2014 and 2019.

Team roster

Major wins
2014
Grand Prix des commerçants de Templeuve, Oliver Naesen

2017
Stage 1 Le Tour de Savoie Mont Blanc, Jimmy Janssens
Stage 3 Le Tour de Savoie Mont Blanc, Kevin de Jonghe
Stage 1 Kreiz Breizh Elites, Joeri Stallaert

2018
Stage 2 Circuit des Ardennes International, Roy Jans
Paris–Mantes-en-Yvelines, Gianni Marchand
Overall Flèche du Sud, Gianni Marchand
Stage 4 Flèche du Sud, Jimmy Janssens
Dwars door de Vlaamse Ardennen, Robby Cobbaert
Stage 3 Kreiz Breizh Elites, Jimmy Janssens
De Kustpijl, Timothy Stevens

References

External links

Cycling teams based in Belgium
Cycling teams established in 2009
UCI Continental Teams (Europe)